Bezgodovo is a rural locality (a settlement) in Gremyachinsky Urban okrug, Perm Krai, Russia. The population was 71 as of 2010. There are 5 streets.

Geography 
Bezgodovo is located 62 km north of Gremyachinsk (the district's administrative centre) by road. Yubileyny is the nearest rural locality.

References 

Rural localities in Perm Krai